"At the Name of Jesus" is an 1870 hymn with lyrics written by Caroline Maria Noel.

The hymn appears in at least 206 hymnals. It was first published with the Ralph Vaughan Williams tune "King's Weston" in Songs of Praise, 1925, from Oxford University Press. An Expanded Edition of this hymnal appeared in 1931. This tune was also found in the Episcopal Church's The Hymnal 1940.

Text
There are various versions of the text. One example has four verses, with a new verse 2 replacing verses 2-4 and verse 6 starting "Brothers" rather than "Christians". The text below is attributed to Oxford University Press on the Hymnary website.

References  

English Christian hymns
1870 songs
Songs about Jesus
19th-century hymns